John Akologu Tia (born 23 September 1954) is a politician and former Minister for Information in Ghana. He was the Member of Parliament for Talensi from 7 January 1993 until he lost to Robert Nachinab Doameng in the 2012 General election.

Early life and education
Akologu was born at Gambaga in the Northern Region of Ghana. He attended the Zobzia Primary School and then the Local Authority Middle School both at Gambaga. His secondary education was at the Tamale Secondary School from 1969 to 1974 where he obtained the GCE Ordinary Level. He later obtained a Diploma in Journalism at the Ghana Institute of Journalism in 1980. He was a student at the Ghana Institute of Management and Public Administration (GIMPA) from 2005 to 2008. He was awarded the Certificate in Management in June 2006. He then got a Diploma in Public Administration in June 2007 and a Bachelor of Arts degree in Public Administration in 2008.

Career
Tia first worked as a pupil teacher between 1974 and 1976. He then worked with the Information Services Department in Ghana in various capacities taking him from Gambaga to Bolgatanga in 1980. Between 1982 and 1990, he worked with the Ghana News Agency.Akologu was active in the Trade Unions between 1985 and 1992. He was a branch secretary and National Executive Council member of the Public Services Workers' Union.

Politics
He got involved in local politics in 1982 when he became the Press Secretary of the Upper East Regional Secretariat of Peoples Defence Committees/Workers Defence Committees set up by the Provisional National Defence Council military government. He was elected an MP in the 1992 parliamentary election as a National Democratic Congress candidate. He has been the MP for Talensi constituency since the first parliament in the Fourth Republic from January 1993 He has been a Member of the ECOWAS Parliament since 2007. In 2009, he was appointed by President Mills as Minister for Information.

Elections 
Akologu was first elected into Parliament during the December 1992 Ghanaian parliamentary election. He was re-elected in 1996 when he won with 16,978 votes out of the 23,815 valid votes cast representing 56.60% over Mariam Adukuma Abagna Kahid who polled 5,759 votes representing 19.20% and Belmogre Caspard Nyaaba who polled 1,078 votes representing 3.60%. He won in the 2000 general election with 9,655 votes out of the 21,311 valid votes cast representing 45.30% over Hajia M. A. Abagna-Khaldi who polled 7,607 votes representing 35.70%, Samuel Kuug Narook who polled 3,341 votes representing 15.70%, John T.Z. Yaroh who polled 459 votes representing 2.20% and Oscar Kurug Tindaan who polled 249 votes representing 1.20%.

He was elected once again as the member of parliament for the Talensi constituency in the 2004 Ghanaian general election.  He won on the ticket of the National Democratic Congress. His constituency was a part of the 9 parliamentary seats out of 13 seats won by the National Democratic Congress in that election for the Upper East Region. The National Democratic Congress won a minority total of 94 parliamentary seats out of 230 seats.  He was elected with 8,346 votes out of 22,148 total valid votes cast. This was equivalent to 37.4% of total valid votes cast. He was elected over Samuel Kuug Narook of the Peoples’ National Convention, Hajia Mariam Abagna Khalidi of the New Patriotic Party, John Teroug Zongbil of the Convention People's Party and Robert N. Doameng Mosore an independent candidate. These obtained 3,001, 5,354, 865 and 4,582 votes respectively of total votes cast. These were equivalent to 13.5%, 24.2%, 3.9%  and 20.7% respectively of total valid votes cast.

Personal life
Akologu is married with four children.

See also 
List of Mills government ministers

References

External links and sources
John Tia on Ghana Parliament website
Profile on Ghana government website
Profile on GhanaDistricts.com

Living people
1954 births
Ghanaian MPs 1993–1997
Ghanaian MPs 1997–2001
Ghanaian MPs 2001–2005
Ghanaian MPs 2005–2009
Ghanaian MPs 2009–2013
Information ministers of Ghana
Ghanaian journalists
National Democratic Congress (Ghana) politicians
21st-century Ghanaian politicians
Government ministers of Ghana
Ghana Institute of Management and Public Administration alumni
People from Upper East Region